Does It Offend You, Yeah? are a British dance-punk band from Reading, Berkshire. They played what was to be their final show on 12 December 2015 at the Electric Ballroom, Camden Town. In September 2021, they announced a new album, titled We Do Our Own Stunts.

History
Does It Offend You, Yeah?, named after a quote from the BBC television series The Office, were formed in 2006 in Reading, UK by James Rushent and Dan Coop and soon joined by Rob Bloomfield and Morgan Quaintance.

They released their first album, You Have No Idea What You're Getting Yourself Into, in Spring 2008. It was written and performed by James Rushent, Rob Bloomfield and Dan Coop. Death From Above 1979 vocalist Sebastien Grainger performed the lead vocals on "Let's Make Out". The song "All the Same" was due to be featured in the album, but was dropped for unknown reasons despite featuring in EA'''s  Need for Speed: Hot Pursuit (2010 video game). "All the Same" was released on streaming platforms in December 2022. In 2008, Does It Offend You, Yeah? was accompanied on stage by guitarist Morgan Quaintance.

Does It Offend You, Yeah? were the ninth most-listened-to new band of 2008 on last.fm and were included in the best alternative music list of 2008 on iTunes USA. They were announced as a Rolling Stone breaking Artist in 2008.

In 2009, Chloe Duveaux (from Elle Milano) and Matty Derham (from Fields) joined the band. Their follow up album, Don't Say We Didn't Warn You, was released in 2011, and peaked at number 3 in the UK Dance chart and number 11 in the Indie chart.

Some have compared them to dance acts like Daft Punk, Justice, and Digitalism, as well as others like Rage Against the Machine. NME compares them to bands like Muse due to their heavier, more "live" sound. The group is known for its raucous live shows, which often end with stage diving and instrument destruction. Vocalist James Rushent would sometimes destroy the drumkit by running and diving into it.

The band have appeared on US television on Jimmy Kimmel Live! and Last Call with Carson Daly. They have also appeared on British television programmes Sound (BBC) and Transmission (Channel 4). They also appeared alongside artists Pharrell Williams, Santigold, Julian Casablancas, MGMT and Karen O as part of The Converse Century Celebration advertising campaign.

Lead singer James Rushent co-produced The Prodigy's top five hit "Omen", as well as their song "Invaders Must Die". Rushent has also remixed songs for acts such as Muse, The Raconteurs and Bloc Party. Bloomfield has remixed songs for 50 Cent, dan le sac vs Scroobius Pip, and P Diddy.

In April 2012 the band released a statement via Facebook that they are now on 'indefinite hiatus'. The statement also revealed that both James Rushent and Dan Coop are working on an electronic music project.

In November 2015 a new EP with the title "How To Kiss a Dragon and Walk Away From It" was announced on Facebook for early 2016. When asked if the band had broken up, the band clarified in the comments that the status of the band was "complicated, not as black and white as people may see it." The band said that if most people think of a band as "start writing, do an album, major label promotion wheel starts up, do a tour/sell the t-shirts, have a holiday, start writing, do an album...then yes, we've broken up." The band then went on to clarify that if others think of a band as "a couple of mates fucking about when we have enough time from our day jobs, and have enough tracks for an EP...then yes, we're still a band."

Tours
In 2008, Does It Offend You, Yeah? completed a headline US tour which reached its climax at the historic Troubadour club in Hollywood. At the show, lead singer James Rushent broke his leg during their last song, although he managed to hobble back on stage for an encore before being rushed to hospital.

At the start of 2008 they went on the NME Awards Tour, alongside The Ting Tings.  They then completed their own headline tour of the UK supported by South Central and Lets Talk Tactics

They went on to open for Bloc Party and Nine Inch Nails on their respective 2008 North American tours. They were also the opening act for The Prodigy on the last date of their UK 2008 club tour.

Does It Offend You, Yeah? have made festival appearances at Coachella, Lollapalooza, South by Southwest, Glastonbury, Reading / Leeds Festival, Summer Sonic, Wireless Festival, Monolith, Global Gathering, Street Scene, Pukkelpop, Dour, Printemps de Bourges, Les Eurockéennes, Vieilles Charrues, Hurricane, Southside, Oxegen, Lowlands, Gatecrasher, Jersey Live, Parklife, V Festival, Pohoda, Exit, NASS Fest and Melt! Festival As well as Strawberry Festival and Zebra Festival in China.

The band supported The Prodigy on their Australasian and Irish leg of the Invaders Must Die Tour and played at the Warrior's Dance Festival in Milton Keynes, England.

They toured with Linkin Park on the A Thousand Suns World Tour UK leg in November 2010 and completed the tour alongside The Prodigy and Pendulum in Northern America.

The Band embarked on a headlining UK tour in March 2011 to promote their latest album Don't Say We Didn't Warn You. They were supported by Hounds and Tripwires.

In August 2015 the band announced a final, one-off gig at the Electric Ballroom in Camden Town on 12 December 2015.

DJ projects
Does It Offend You, Yeah? also DJ at various clubs and festivals across the world. They have done so on the same bill as acts such as, Justice, Peaches, MSTRKRFT, Simian Mobile Disco, Steve Aoki, DJ AM, Ladytron, Samantha Ronson and 2 Many DJ's.

Final show
The band shared a transmission via their Facebook on 11 August announcing they will play their final show at the Electric Ballroom on 12 December 2015.
Setlist included all songs from "You Have No Idea What You're Getting Yourself Into" and most of "Don't Say We Didn't Warn You", as well as new songs "Let's Go" and "Stormy Weather". The band closed with "Epic Last Song" along with "We Are Rockstars".

 Return 
On 1 July 2021, the band announced another show via social media, to take place on 23 December 2021 at the Electric Ballroom in London. The show was later rescheduled for 5 May 2022.

On September 17, 2021, Does it Offend You Yeah? premiered a teaser video on their YouTube channel, announcing a comeback album titled We Do Our Own Stunts.

On April 14, 2022, the band premiered their new single, "Guess Who Just Rolled Back Into Town" on their Facebook page and YouTube channel.

Band name
The band revealed the origins of their name as being from British sitcom The Office.

Members
 James Rushent – lead vocals, bass guitar, synthesizer (2006–2015)
 Dan Coop – synthesizer (2006–2015)
 Rob Bloomfield – drums, backing vocals (2006–2015)
 Chloe Duveaux – bass guitar, backing vocals (2009–2012)
 Matty Derham – guitar, backing vocals (2009–2015)
 Steve 'Munky' Muncaster – Drummer, Babe (2021-Present)

Former members
 Morgan Quaintance – guitar, synthesizer, backing vocals (2007–2009)

Guest musicians
 Sebastien Grainger – lead vocals

Discography
Albums

EPsLive @ The Fez (2008) – Live digital download EP included with every pre-order of the album.iTunes Live: London Festival '08 (2008)iTunes – Live at Lollapalooza 2008: Does It Offend You, Yeah? EPSingles

Remixes
 Bloc Party – "The Prayer" (Also featured on Need for Speed: ProStreet)(Wichita) Rushent / Coop
 Muse – "Map of the Problematique" (Warner Bros) Rushent / Coop
 50 Cent – "Do You Think About Me" (Interscope) Bloomfield
 dan le sac vs Scroobius Pip – "Cauliflower" (Sunday Best) Bloomfield
 The Raconteurs – "Steady, As She Goes" (White) Rushent / Coop
 The White Stripes – "Fell in Love with a Girl" (White) Rushent / Coop
 Hadouken! – "Crank It Up" (Atlantic Records) Rushent
 The Faint – "The Geeks Were Right" (Saddle Creek) Bloomfield
 Air Traffic – "Charlotte" (Unreleased) Rushent
 Muse – "Uprising" (Warner Bros) Rushent
 Linkin Park – "The Catalyst" (Warner Bros) Bloomfield
 Natalia Kills – "Zombie" (Interscope) Bloomfield
 Escape The Fate – "Issues" (Interscope) Bloomfield
 The Naked and Famous – "Does Being Famous Offend Nudes (Punching in a Dream Remix)" Bloomfield
 Gavin James (singer) – The Book Of Love
 ok tokyo – You Better Believe It
 The Naked and Famous – Punching in a Dream

Covers
"Whip It" originally by Devo – Played live and a live recording was included on the NME Awards 2008 souvenir CD which came free with every issue of the edition of 27 February 2008 of NME'' magazine.

Music videos
 "Weird Science" – 2007
 "Let's Make Out" – 2007
 "We Are Rockstars" – 2008
 "Epic Last Song" – 2008
 "Dawn of the Dead" – 2008
 "We Are the Dead" – 2010
 "The Monkeys Are Coming" – 2011
 "Pull Out My Insides" – 2011

References

External links
 

English rock music groups
Dance-punk musical groups
Musical groups established in 2006
Musical groups disestablished in 2012
Musical groups from Reading, Berkshire